Ishmael Baidoo (born 1 December 1998) is a Ghanaian professional footballer who plays as a winger for Greek Super League 2 club Veria.

Career

Septemvri Sofia
In the beginning of 2017 Baidoo joined the Bulgarian team Septemvri Sofia. He made his debut for the team in Second League on 17 April 2017 in match against Vitosha Bistritsa by also scoring a goal.

He completed his professional debut on 17 July 2017, playing in the first league game for the season in First League against Dunav Ruse. On 24 April 2017 he scored his first goal for the season and his first goal in the professional football, in a league match against Lokomotiv Plovdiv.

Górnik Zabrze
On 5 February 2019 he signed a 3.5 year deal with Górnik Zabrze with the option of prolonging it. On 22 February 2020 it was confirmed, that he had joined FK Železiarne Podbrezová in Slovakia on loan for the rest of the season. On 4 September 2020, he joined Pogoń Siedlce on a season-long loan.

International career

Youth levels
In 2015 he was called up to the 26-man provisional Ghana U17 squad for the WAFU U17 tournament.

Career statistics

Club

References

External links
 

1998 births
Living people
Footballers from Accra
Ghanaian footballers
Association football midfielders
Ghanaian expatriate footballers
FC Septemvri Sofia players
Aspire Academy (Senegal) players
Górnik Zabrze players
FK Železiarne Podbrezová players
MKP Pogoń Siedlce players
Veria NFC players
First Professional Football League (Bulgaria) players
Second Professional Football League (Bulgaria) players
Ekstraklasa players
II liga players
III liga players
Ghanaian expatriate sportspeople in Qatar
Ghanaian expatriate sportspeople in Bulgaria
Ghanaian expatriate sportspeople in Poland
Ghanaian expatriate sportspeople in Slovakia
Expatriate footballers in Qatar
Expatriate footballers in Bulgaria
Expatriate footballers in Poland
Expatriate footballers in Slovakia